Acacia puncticulata is a shrub of the genus Acacia and the subgenus Phyllodineae that is endemic to an area along the west coast of Australia.

Description
Like many species of Acacia it has phyllodes rather than true leaves. It blooms from August to September and produces yellow flowers. The inflorescences occur singly in the axils and have spherical to obloid shaped flower-heads containing 35 to 60 golden coloured flowers. After flowering seed pods form that have a spirally coiled shape.

Distribution
It is native to an area in the Wheatbelt and Mid West regions of Western Australia where it is commonly situated on sandplains, rocky granite hills and outcrops growing in rocky and loamy or sandy soils. The shrub has a discontinuous distribution from around Perenjori and Three Springs in the south east to the Murchison River in the north west usually as a part of tall shrubland communities often in association with Acacia acuminata.

See also
 List of Acacia species

References

puncticulata
Acacias of Western Australia
Taxa named by Bruce Maslin
Plants described in 1999